The Killing Floor is a 2007 American thriller film. It was directed by Gideon Raff, and stars Marc Blucas, Shiri Appleby, and Reiko Aylesworth.

Plot

David Lamont, a book publisher who is known to be ruthless toward friends, foes, and clients alike, moves into his new penthouse apartment. There he meets his mysterious and beautiful neighbor, Audrey Lavine, who lives on the third floor. Shortly thereafter, he receives a visit from an investigator and a man who claims that the penthouse belongs to his father who never sold it.

David tells them the apartment is his, everything is in legal order, and if they have a problem to talk with his lawyer. Soon after he starts receiving packages with the crime scene photos that apparently were taken in his penthouse.  Later he begins to receive video tapes documenting his every move and believes someone is after him. With his assistant, Rebecca Fay, David begins to discover who or what is behind everything that is occurring.

Cast
 Marc Blucas as David Lamont
 Shiri Appleby as Rebecca Fay
 Reiko Aylesworth as Audrey Levine
 John Bedford Lloyd as Detective Soll
 Allison McAtee as Kathy Mahoni
 Derek Cecil as Garret Rankin
 Roberta Maxwell as Ms. Alimet
 Jeffrey Carlson as Jared Thurber
 Joel Leffert as Goodman
 Andrew Weems as Bobby

Release
The World Premiere for The Killing Floor was at 9:30 P.M., April 14, 2007 at the Malibu Film Festival. The Region 1 DVD rights have been acquired by THINKFilm with a direct-to-DVD release of January 8, 2008.

The film was released on DVD in Sweden by Noble Entertainment on March 14, 2007.  The release date for the UK was May 21, 2007.

References

External links
 
 
 
 

2007 films
2007 thriller films
Films directed by Gideon Raff
Films scored by Michael Wandmacher
American thriller films
2000s English-language films
2000s American films